Tang-e Bastak (also Romanized as Tang-i-Bastak; also known as Gardaneh-ye Bastak) is a village in Fatuyeh Rural District, in the Central District of Bastak County, Hormozgan Province, Iran. At the 2006 census, its population was 66, in 13 families.

References 

Populated places in Bastak County